Sebastian Małkowski (born 2 March 1987) is a Polish professional footballer, who plays as a goalkeeper for Worksop Town.

He is a former Poland international who earned a single cap in 2011. He notably played in the Ekstraklasa for Lechia Gdańsk and Zawisza Bydgoszcz, as well as for Olimpia Sztum, Wisła Tczew and Bytovia Bytów. In 2015 he emigrated to England and began playing semi-professional football for Frickley Athletic, Wombwell Town, Belper Town and Boston United.

Club career
He played in the Ekstraklasa for Lechia Gdańsk and Zawisza Bydgoszcz, as well as for Wisła Tczew and Bytovia Bytów.

In January 2018, Małkowski suffered an anterior cruciate ligament injury. His contract with Frickley Athletic expired in May 2018, and on 19 October after getting fit from his injury, he joined Boston United. Before he signed, he played three matches for Barnsley-based Wombwell Town in September 2018. He played one game for the club again in January 2019.

In February 2019, Małkowski joined Belper Town on a dual registration.

In 2022, he signed for Worksop Town.

International career
Małkowski was called up to the Poland squad and played in a 2-0 defeat against Lithuania, playing the full 90 minutes

References

External links 
 

1987 births
Living people
People from Tczew
Polish footballers
Poland international footballers
Association football goalkeepers
Lechia Gdańsk players
Ekstraklasa players
Sportspeople from Pomeranian Voivodeship
Zawisza Bydgoszcz players
Frickley Athletic F.C. players
Boston United F.C. players
Belper Town F.C. players